Sir Rose Price, 1st Baronet (21 November 1768 - 24 September 1834) was a British baronet, plantation owner and Cornish landowner.

Career

On the death of his father in 1797, Rose Price inherited a number of plantations on Jamaica,
 Mickleton Penn – which produced sugar and rum, and in 1799 had 34 enslaved people
 Spring Garden – which produced corn, steers, mules, horses and sheep
 Cocoree –  when inherited, Rose Price made four purchases of  each
 Worthy Park – which grew cane and produced sugar and rum.

In 1813, Price purchased Trengwainton and lived at Kenegie in nearby Gulval,  until 1817, while he rebuilt the house and pleasure gardens under the direction of Mr George Brown. While rebuilding Trengwainton, the Price Baronetcy, of Trengwainton, in the parish of Madron, was created in the baronetage of the United Kingdom on 30 May 1815.

Family
He was the only child of John Price (1738–1797) and Elizabeth Williams Brammer. He married Elizabeth Lambart, daughter of Charles Lambart and Frances Dutton, in 1795. He acquired the title of 1st Baronet Price, of Trengwainton in 1815.

Depending on the source, they had 10 or 14 children,
 Rose Lambart (4 July 1799 – 15 January 1826), married Catherine, Countess of Desard (died 16 January 1826) 
 Sir Charles Dutton, 2nd Baronet (7 December 1800 – 18 May 1872)
 Captain Francis (11 Mar 1804 – 14 Sep 1863)
 Elizabeth Mary (1805– 4 July 1843)
 Charlotte (1806 – 25 October 1868), married Thomas Charles Higgins (1797–1865) of Turvey House
 John (21 October 1808 – 27 March 1857) 
 George (10 April 1812 – 29 September 1890)
 Louisa Douglas (1815– 18 December 1881)
 Thomas (3 Nov 1817 – 1865)
 Jane Frances (1819– 19 August 1903)

Rose Price died on 24 September 1834 and is buried in the Rose Price mausoleum, Madron churchyard.

References

Sources

 
 
 

1768 births
1834 deaths
Baronets in the Baronetage of the United Kingdom
British planters
British slave owners
High Sheriffs of Cornwall
Jamaican planters
People from Penzance
Recipients of payments from the Slavery Abolition Act 1833